Gasquet is a French surname. Notable people with the surname include:

Francis Aidan Gasquet, English Benedictine monk and cardinal
Joachim Gasquet, French writer
Marie Gasquet, French writer
Richard Gasquet, French tennis player
Arno Gasquet, French Sculptor

See also
Gasquet, California, unincorporated community

Surnames of French origin
Occitan-language surnames